Not to be confused with the historical Ballarat Welsh Eisteddfods.

The Royal South Street Eisteddfod, also known as The Grand National Eisteddfod of Australasia, is held annually in Ballarat, Australia and is administered by the Royal South Street Society. South Street began as a debating competition run by the South Street Society in 1891 and attained "Royal" status in 1962. It soon grew and now includes public speaking, acting, singing, music, dance and calisthenics. Since 1965 it has been held in Her Majesty's Theatre Ballarat, Australia's oldest continually operating theatre. It was purchased after the South Street Society ran an appeal. Today Her Majesty's is the main venue for the Eisteddfod, but it was gifted to the City of Ballarat in 1987 to enable government funding for major upgrades, restorations and maintenance work.

There were virtual competitions since 2020, but will return live in 2022.

Competitors
Notable competitors past eisteddfods include:
James Scullin
Alfred Deakin
Mary Grant Bruce
Amy Castles
Joan Kirner
Denise Drysdale
David Atkins
Kiri Te Kanawa

References

External links
 Royal South Street Society

Ballarat
Eisteddfod
Festivals in Victoria (Australia)